Presidential elections were held in the breakaway republic of Transnistria on 1 December, 1991. These were the first such elections in the newly founded Pridnestrovian Moldavian Republic, and were won by Igor Smirnov, one of the country's founders. Smirnov faced two opponents: Grigore Mărăcuţă and Grigoriy Blagodarniy. Mărăcuţă would become an ally of Smirnov and was speaker of the Supreme Council until 2005.

Results

References

1991 elections in Moldova
Elections in Transnistria
1991 in Transnistria
Election and referendum articles with incomplete results